Defina is a small town and commune in the Cercle of Bougouni in the Sikasso Region of southern Mali. In 1998 the commune had a population of 6,109.

References

Communes of Sikasso Region